Gymnoclytia ferruginea is a North American species of tachinid flies in the genus Gymnoclytia of the family Tachinidae.

References

Phasiinae
Diptera of North America
Insects described in 1934